The Wentworth Mansion is a hotel in Charleston, South Carolina.

It was built in 1886 as a home for cotton merchant Francis Silas Rodgers (b. 7 May 1841, d. 13 Mar 1911 (aged 69)) and his family.  Rodgers' is buried in
Magnolia Cemetery.

The mansion is Second Empire in style.

The Rodgers Mansion was purchased in 1920 for US$100,000 by the Scottish Rite Cathedral Association of Charleston, a Masonic organization. In 1922 it constructed an auditorium which could accommodate the organization's 600 members on the property, connected by a corridor to the mansion; the auditorium was removed some time later.

It is a contributing property in the Charleston Historic District.

It was listed as a member of Historic Hotels of America by the National Trust for Historic Preservation since 2003.

Notes

References

Charleston, South Carolina

Hotels in South Carolina
National Register of Historic Places in Charleston, South Carolina
Historic Hotels of America